Something Worth Leaving Behind is the fourth studio album from American country music singer Lee Ann Womack, released in 2002. It peaked on the Billboard 200 at #16 and the Top Country Albums at #2. Two singles were released from the album; the title-track (a Top 20 hit) and "Forever Everyday". This was also the first album of Womack's career not to produce a Top Ten country hit.

Background
Womack told The Early Show "It's very much in line with my last three. This is my fourth project. You know, I have the real traditional country songs on there, and then I have some things that are a little more contemporary and up-tempo. And—and, but I—you know, I try to find songs from the best songwriters that I can." Womack told Billboard, "Every album seems critical when you are making it. I have a lot of confidence in my team. You can't predict commercially what an album is going to do. I just have to make the best music I can and move on. I've never, ever felt like in my career that everything hinges on the next single. I don't worry about it."

In 2005, Womack told The Dallas Morning News, "I didn't have that much fun making Something Worth Leaving Behind. Now that I look back on it, because of the success that I had prior, I was so worried that I was gonna not measure up to that, that I over-thought everything on that record. I tried...to please everybody with that record...myself, radio, the listeners, everybody who loved 'Never Again, Again' and everybody who loved 'I Hope You Dance.' And it just didn't work. It backfired."

Critical reception

Tim Perry of The Independent wrote, "Following such an album is a hard task, but someone of her newfound stature can avail herself of the best songwriters. This is solid, radio-friendly stuff. Brian Mansfield of USA Today listed it as the tenth worst album of 2002 and wrote, "Womack's ill-advised crossover ploy and a makeover that made her look like Britney Spears' mother made one of Nashville's most respected singers the butt of jokes." Michael Paoletta of Billboard wrote, "Womack is brilliant vocalist who is at a career crossroads; here's hoping she leans toward substance over style." Ralph Novak of People Magazine gave the album a mixed review and wrote, " Womack's voice, which can trickle off and become a wan instrument, gains noticeably in vigor when she approaches more energetic material."

Track listing

Personnel
Adapted from Something Worth Leaving Behind liner notes.

Tracks 1–3, 5, 6, 8, 9, 12
Musicians
 Eric Darken – percussion
 Shannon Forrest – drums
 Paul Franklin – steel guitar
 Kenny Greenberg – electric guitar
 Aubrey Haynie – fiddle
 Chuck Leavell – piano
 B. James Lowry – acoustic guitar
 Brent Mason – electric guitar, gut string guitar
 Steve Nathan – synthesizer, piano, Hammond organ
 Michael Rhodes – bass guitar
 Brent Rowan – electric guitar, tiple
 Randy Scruggs – acoustic guitar
 Bryan Sutton – banjo, mandolin

Background vocalists
 Bob Bailey
 Lisa Cochran
 Kim Fleming
 Vicki Hampton
 Marabeth Jordan
 Kim Keyes
 Gene Miller
 Chris Rodriguez
 Keith Sewell
 Bergen White

Technical
 Greg Droman – mixing, mastering
 Todd Gunnerson – engineering
 Lee Ann Womack – producer
 Mark Wright – producer

Tracks 4, 7, 10, 11
Musicians
 Spencer Campbell – bass guitar
 Paul Franklin – steel guitar
 Kenny Greenberg – acoustic guitar, electric guitar
 David Grissom – acoustic guitar, electric guitar
 Jay Joyce – acoustic guitar, electric guitar, programming
 Colin Linden – acoustic guitar
 Chris McHugh – drums
 Jerry McPherson – electric guitar
 Jeffrey Roach – piano, keyboards

Background vocalists
 Dan Colehour
 Kim Fleming
 Vicki Hampton
 Bobby Huff
 Marcus Hummon
 Fleming McWilliams
 Buddy Miller
 Julie Miller
 Bruce Robison

Technical
 Chad Brown – engineering
 David Bryant – engineering
 Brian Graben – engineering
 Kenny Greenberg – additional arrangements
 Tony High – engineering
 Jim Jordan – engineering
 Jay Joyce – additional arrangements
 Frank Liddell – producer
 James Lightman – digital editing
 Mike McCarthy – producer, recording, mixing
 Bryan McConkey – engineering
 Darren Redfield – engineering
 Leslie Richter – engineering
 Lee Ann Womack – producer

Track 13
Musicians
 Kenny Aronoff – drums
 Jim Cox – keyboards
 Brad Dutz – percussion
 Jon Gilutin – keyboards
 Greg Leisz – steel guitar
 Hector Periera – guitars
 Tim Pierce – guitars
 Leland Sklar – bass guitar
 Gabe Witcher – fiddle

Background vocals
 Maxi Anderson
 Tommy Funderburk
 Maxine Waters
 Oren Waters

Technical
 Pete Anthony – conductor
 Jay Goin – mixing assistant
 Noel Golden – recording
 Jessie Gorman – recording assistant
 Jimmy Hoyson – string recording assistant
 Toshiaki Kasai – recording assistant
 Stephen Marcussen – mastering
 Leslie Richter – recording assistant
 Matt Serletic – producer, arranger
 Shari Sutcliffe – orchestra contractor
 Kevin Szymanski – recording assistant
 David Thoener – mixing
 Stewart Whitmore – digital editing

Additional credits
Horn section on track 8: Jim Horn, Jeff Coffin, Dennis Solee

Strings on tracks 1, 3, 4, 6, 8–13 performed by the Nashville String Machine, arranged by David Campbell (1, 3, 8), John Painter (4, 10, 11), Bergen White (9, 12), Kris Wilkinson (6), Matt Serletic (13)

Technical credits on all tracks
 Matthew Rolston – photography
 Ronnie Thomas – editing
 Hank Williams – mastering

Charts

Weekly charts

Year-end charts

References

2002 albums
MCA Records albums
Albums arranged by David Campbell (composer)
Albums produced by Mark Wright (record producer)
Lee Ann Womack albums